The Apostolic Prefecture of Misurata is a Latin Church missionary territory or apostolic prefecture of the Catholic Church in Misurata, Libya.

It is exempt to the Holy See and not part of any ecclesiastical province. The apostolic prefecture has been vacant since 1969.

History 
The Prefecture was established on 22 June 1939, on territory split from the Apostolic Vicariate of Tripolitana (now renamed Tripoli).

Ordinaries 
All Friars Minor (O.F.M.) and from Italy 

Apostolic Prefects of Misurata
 Vitale Bonifacio Bertoli (O.F.M.) (1948.02.20 – 1951.04.05) (later Titular Bishop of Attæa and Apostolic Vicar of Tripolitana)
 Illuminato Colombo, O.F.M. (1951.04.20 – 1957)
 Guido Attilio Previtali, O.F.M. (1958.12.05 – 1969.06.26 see below)
 apostolic administrator Guido Attilio Previtali (see above; 1969.08.04 – 1985.05.03), Titular Bishop of Sozusa in Libya, Apostolic Vicar of Tripoli

See also
Roman Catholicism in Libya

Source and External links 
 GigaCatholic

Apostolic prefectures
Roman Catholic dioceses in Libya